Bob Laden (AKA Robert Laden)  is a makeup artist who has been nominated twice for Academy Award for Best Makeup and Hairstyling.

Oscar nominations

1987 Academy Awards, nominated for Happy New Year. Lost to Harry and the Hendersons.
1995 Academy Awards, nominated for Roommates, nomination shared with Colleen Callaghan and Greg Cannom. Lost to Braveheart.

Selected filmography

Amistad (1997)
Thinner (1996)
Roommates (1995)
Wolf (1994)
Chaplin (1992)
Scent of a Woman (1992)
Happy New Year (1987)
Prizzi's Honor (1985)
The Wiz (1978)

References

External links

Living people
Year of birth missing (living people)
Make-up artists
Place of birth missing (living people)